Field Marshal Khalifa bin Ahmed Al Khalifa (born 1946) is a Bahraini soldier who serves as Commander-in-Chief of the Bahrain Defence Force (BDF).

Biography	
Enrolling at the Royal Military Academy Sandhurst on December 19, 1968, Al Khalifa also completed many military courses in Arab countries and elsewhere along with a master’s degree in military science from the Joint Services Command and Staff College of the United Kingdom on October 27, 1972. He was meanwhile appointed assistant commander of the recruits at the BDF Training Center on April 10, 1968 and led the graduation column for the first batch of recruits of the BDF in 1969, later that year becoming commander of the 1st Mechanized Infantry Battalion.

On January 19, 1974, Emir Isa bin Salman Al Khalifa appointed him Chief of Staff of the BDF. This was followed on March 13, 1988, by  Khalifa bin Ahmed being named Deputy Commander-in-Chief and Minister of Defense. On January 29, 2001, Emir and soon-to-be King of Bahrain Hamad bin Isa promoted Khalifa bin Ahmed to Lieutenant-General, followed by the titles of BDF Commander-in-Chief on January 6, 2008, and the rank of field marshal on February 8, 2011.

Awards
 Order of Ahmed al-Fateh
 Order of Sheikh Isa bin Salman Al Khalifa
 Bahrain Medal
 Military Service Appreciation Medal
 Military Duty Medal
 Kuwait Liberation Medal
 United States Legion of Merit
 Saudi Arabian Peninsula Shield Medal
 United Arab Emirates Gulf Cooperation Council Medal
 Order of the Star of Jordan
 Order of the Republic (Egypt)
 Order of the Two Rivers
 International Military Sports Council Medal

References

Government ministers of Bahrain
1946 births
House of Khalifa
Graduates of the Royal Military Academy Sandhurst
Living people